Greve is a surname. Notable people with the name include:

 Aleida Greve (1670–1740), Dutch painter
 Arent Greve (1733–1808), Norwegian painter and goldsmith
 Bredo Greve (1871–1931), Norwegian architect
 Bob Greve (born 1930), Australian footballer (Australian rules)
 Carl-Heinz Greve (1920–1998), German military aviator
 Carsten Greve (born 1965), Danish academic
 Cecilie Greve (born 1992), Danish handball player
 Ellen Greve (born 1957), Australian self-help writer
 Georg C. F. Greve (born 1973), German software developer, physicist and author
 Hanne Sophie Greve (born 1952), Norwegian judge
 Jan Greve, Norwegian psychiatrist
 Jan Einar Greve (born 1933), Norwegian lawyer
 Karsten Greve (born 1946), German art dealer
 Mathias Sigwardt Greve (1832–1912), Norwegian physician
 Michael Greve, American academic
 Otto Heinrich Greve (1868-1968), German politician
 Tim Greve (1928–1986), Norwegian historian, civil servant, diplomatist, newspaper editor and biographer

See also
Grieve (surname)
Greves, surname